Miss World America 1994 was the 6th edition of the Miss World America pageant and it was held in Veracruz, Mexico and was won by Kristie Harmon of Georgia. She was crowned by outgoing titleholder, Maribeth Brown of Massachusetts. Harmon went on to represent the United States at the Miss World 1994 Pageant in South Africa later that year. She did not place at Miss World.

Results

Placements

Delegates
The Miss World America 1994 delegates were:

 Alabama - Lilly Kamar
 California - Angi Aylor
 Delaware - Beth Ann Jones
 District of Columbia - Evangelin Smith
 Florida -  Jessica White
 Georgia - Kristie Harmon
 Hawaii - Annette Michard
 Idaho - Randi Thorp
 Illinois - Brenda Blazek
 Indiana - Shelly McKown
 Iowa - Ronda Carpenter
 Kentucky - Mimi Ford
 Louisiana - Crystal Downs
 Maryland - Jennifer Kelly
 Massachusetts - Michelle Gados
 Michigan - Lainie Lu Howard
 Minnesota - Heather McLeod
 Mississippi - Shea Broom
 Nebraska - Lisa Hatch
 Nevada - Alexis Oliver
 New Jersey - Yvonne Christiano
 New Mexico - Gina Swankie
 New York - Fionna Kennedy
 North Carolina - Michelle Mauney
 Ohio - Marcia Mcguire
 Oklahoma - Penny Smith
 Pennsylvania - Terri MacIntosch
 Rhode Island - Tina Cordeira
 South Carolina - Michelle Pitts
 Tennessee - Stephanie Kan
 Texas - Ara Celi Valdez
 Utah - Natalie Dixon
 Virginia - Chera Wood
 Washington - Celine Clements
 West Virginia - Amanda Mobley
 Wisconsin - Angela Pastorelli

Notes

Withdrawals

Returns
Last competed in 1992:

Did not compete

Crossovers
Contestants who competed in other beauty pageants:

Miss Teen USA
1992: : Kristie Harmon

Miss USA
1992: : Lainie Lu Howard
1993: : Alexis Oliver
1995: : Michelle Mauney

References

External links
Miss World Official Website
Miss World America Official Website

1994 in the United States
World America
1994
1994 in Mexico